The 1974 Alcorn State Braves football team was an American football team that represented Alcorn State University in the Southwestern Athletic Conference (SWAC) during 1974 NCAA Division II football season. In their 11th season under head coach Marino Casem, the Braves compiled an 9–2 record (5–1 against conference opponents), won the SWAC championship, and outscored opponents by a total of 282 to 161. Alcorn State advanced to the NCAA Division II Football Championship playoffs, where the lost to UNLV in the quarterfinals.

Alcorn State was recognized as the black college national champion and was ranked No. 14 in the final Associated Press 1974 NCAA College Division rankings.

Schedule

References

Alcorn State
Alcorn State Braves football seasons
Black college football national champions
Southwestern Athletic Conference football champion seasons
Alcorn State Braves football